An arbiter or arbitrator is a person by whose decision the parties to a dispute agree to be bound in arbitration.

Arbiter may refer to:

Fiction
 Arbiter (Halo), a character in the Halo video game series
The Arbiter, a character from the musical Chess
 Arbiter-class starships, Protoss support vessels in the StarCraft science-fiction series.
 Arbiter class starships, Starfleet battlecruiser in the Star Trek Online MMORPG.
 Arbiter, a demonic battleaxe used by Dante in the video game DmC: Devil May Cry.
 Arbiters, the beings from Death Parade that decide whether a soul gets reincarnated or sent into the void after death.

Other
 Discussion moderator
 Arbiter (electronics), a component in electronic circuitry that allocates scarce resources
 Memory arbiter, a component that allocates memory
 Wavefront arbiter, a commercial memory arbiter optimized for high-speed operation
 ArbiterSports, a sports officiating software company owned by the NCAA
 HMS Arbiter (D31), an escort aircraft carrier in the Royal Navy of the United Kingdom
 International Arbiter, in chess a title conferred by FIDE to match referees
 Dickie Arbiter (born 1940), British television and radio commentator
 Petronius (27–66), Roman author and satirist known formally as Gaius Petronius Arbiter
 One of the names of the Hindu deity Hanuman
 Arbiter, the title of the leader of Jinsy Island in UK comedy series This is Jinsy
 Pagyda arbiter, a moth in the family Crambidae
 Arbiter (album)